Phantasmarana bocainensis, also known as Bocaina Big tooth frog is a species of frog in the family Hylodidae. It is endemic to Brazil and only known from its type locality in the Serra da Bocaina National Park, São Paulo state.

It was formerly placed in the genus Megaelosia, but was reclassified to Phantasmarana in 2021.

Description
The dorsolateral skin is granular. The snout is rounded in dorsal view and bluntly rounded in profile. The canthus rostralis is evident and slightly arcuated.

Habitat and conservation
The holotype was found concealed under a rock at the margin of a mountain stream at night. Threats to this species are unknown but the type locality is a protected area.
Since its last sighting in 1968, the Phantasmarana bocainensis frog was presumed to have been extinct. In August 2020, researchers conducted eDNA metabarcoding to extract DNA left behind by living organisms in rivers, ponds, bromeliads, streams and puddles in southeastern Brazil. From this sampling, they found DNA from the Phantasmarana bocainensis frog and confirmed the presence of the species.

References

bocainensis
Amphibians described in 1993
Endemic fauna of Brazil
Amphibians of Brazil
Taxonomy articles created by Polbot